The 2008 Kraft Nabisco Championship was played April 3–6 at Mission Hills Country Club in Rancho Mirage, California. This was the 37th edition of the Kraft Nabisco Championship, and the 26th as a major championship.

Top-ranked Lorena Ochoa shot a bogey-free 67 in the final round to win her only Kraft Nabisco Championship, five strokes ahead of  Suzann Pettersen and Annika Sörenstam. It was her second consecutive and final major title; she won the Women's British Open in 2007.

Past champions in the field

Made the cut

Missed the cut

Source:

Round summaries

First round
Thursday, April 3, 2008

Source:

Second round
Friday, April 4, 2008

Source:

Amateurs: Uribe (E), Blumenherst (+2),  Blackwelder (+3)

Third round
Saturday, April 5, 2008

Source:

Final round
Sunday, April 6, 2008

Source:

Amateurs: Blumenherst (+5), Uribe (+12), Blackwelder (+14)

Scorecard
Final round
 
Cumulative tournament scores, relative to par

Source:

References

External links
Golf Observer leaderboard

Chevron Championship
Golf in California
Kraft Nabisco Championship
Kraft Nabisco Championship
Kraft Nabisco Championship
Kraft Nabisco Championship